David Bala was a Singaporean comedian and actor. He was best known for his roles in Tetangga, Just Follow Law, Ah Long Pte Ltd and The Ghosts Must Be Crazy.

Career
Bala was first introduced to acting by a friend and started his career as a stage actor in 1976 and made his broadcast debut in 1979 on Radio Television Singapore's "Kaatchiyum Kaanamum", a radio drama production. In 1980, he made his television debut where he was cast as the lead actor in a comedy drama series, "Ippadiyum Oru Kudumbam".

Due to the success of the series, Bala was known by many as "Comedy King" and in 2007, he was cast as one of the actors in Jack Neo's film, Just Follow Law. In the same year David was also given a lead role on Mediacorp Suria's Tetangga and in 2008, he was cast in  Ah Long Pte Ltd.

In 2011, Bala was cast in The Ghosts Must Be Crazy. This is arguably one of Bala's best-known roles, as a catchphrase of his character in the film became a meme.

Personal life
Other than acting, Bala was working as a security officer at Republic Polytechnic since January 2014.

Death
Bala died on August 29, 2014 due to heart disease and is survived by his wife and 4 children. His remains were placed in the niche at Mandai Columbarium & Crematorium.

Filmography

Movies

TV series

Awards

References

Singaporean male actors
Singaporean male stage actors
Singaporean male film actors
20th-century Singaporean male actors
Singaporean people of Tamil descent
1947 births
2014 deaths